Wear Valley was, from 1974 to 2009, a local government district in County Durham, England. Its council and district capital was Crook.

The district covered much of the Weardale area. In the west it was parished and rural, whereas in the east it was more urban. Crook and Willington are unparished.

The district was formed on 1 April 1974, under the Local Government Act 1972, by the merger of the Bishop Auckland, Crook and Willington and Tow Law urban districts, along with Weardale Rural District.

The district was abolished as part of the 2009 structural changes to local government in England, becoming part of the Durham County Council unitary authority.

Wear Valley had a population of around 65,000 in 2001.

Electoral divisions 
At the time Wear Valley District Council was abolished the electoral wards were:

Bishop Auckland Town ward
Cockton Hill ward
Coundon ward
Dene Valley ward
Crook North ward
Howden ward
Tow Law and Stanley ward
Crook South ward
Wheatbottom and Helmington Row ward
St John's Chapel ward
Stanhope ward
Wolsingham and Witton-le-Wear ward
Escomb ward 
West Auckland ward
Hunwick ward
Willington Central ward
Willington West End ward
Henknowle ward
Woodhouse Close ward

Largest settlements 
1. Bishop Auckland - 24,000

2. Crook - 13,000

3. Willington - 5,000

External links
Durham Dales

English districts abolished in 2009
Former non-metropolitan districts of Durham